Pavle Nikolov (born May 6, 1992) is a Macedonian  professional basketball coach of Kožuv.

External links

References

1992 births
Living people
Macedonian men's basketball players
People from Negotino